George Colin Moss (20 August 1913 – 27 May 1985) was an Australian politician.

He was born in Numurkah to farmer Frederick George Moss and schoolteacher Mary Jane McArthur. He attended local state schools and worked on the family farm until 1938, when he established a wheat farm of his own at Katunga. From 1940 he had a sheep and cattle farm, but during World War II he served in the military. On 13 June 1942 he married Katrine Nancy Fankhauser, with whom he had four daughters. He was elected to the Victorian Legislative Assembly in 1945 as the Country Party member for Murray Valley. From 1950 to 1952 he was Minister of Agriculture and Mines. In 1955 he became deputy leader of the party, succeeding to the leadership in 1964. He relinquished the leadership to Peter Ross-Edwards in 1970 and retired in 1973. Moss died at Numurkah in 1985.

References

1913 births
1985 deaths
National Party of Australia members of the Parliament of Victoria
Members of the Victorian Legislative Assembly
20th-century Australian politicians
Victorian Ministers for Agriculture